This is the list of things named after René Descartes (1596–1650), a French philosopher, mathematician, and scientist.

Computer science
Cartesian genetic programming
Cartesian tree

Mathematics
Cartesian closed category
Cartesian geometry
Cartesian coordinate system
Cartesian equations
Cartesian plane
Cartesian tensor
Cartesian monoid
Cartesian monoidal category
Cartesian closed category
Cartesian oval
Cartesian product
Cartesian product of graphs
Cartesian square
Cartesian morphisms
Descartes number
Descartes' rule of signs
Descartes snark
Descartes' theorem
Descartes' theorem on total angular defect
Folium of Descartes

Physics
Cartesian diver
Cartesian vortex theory
Snell–Descartes law

Philosophy
Cartesian anxiety
Cartesian circle
Cartesian doubt
Cartesian dualism
Cartesian materialism
Cartesian other
Cartesian theater
Cartesian Method
Descartes' demon

Robotics
Cartesian coordinate robot
Cartesian parallel manipulators

Other
Blanche Descartes
Cartesian linguistics
Cartesian Meditations
Cartesian Reflections
Descartes (crater)
Descartes-class cruiser
Descartes' Error
Descartes-Huygens Prize
Descartes Island (Antarctica)
Descartes on Polyhedra
Descartes Prize
Lycée René Descartes (Champs-sur-Marne)

Descartes
Descartes